

History
Chandler Preparatory Academy  is a small liberal arts charter school that was established in 2005 offering schooling for Grades 6-12. In 2010, Chandler Preparatory Academy celebrated its first graduating class, which consisted of fewer than fifty students; and, also opened their current campus, with a football field and gym. The campus opened in conjunction with Archway Classical Academy, a similarly modeled school for K-5 students. In 2019, 10 seniors at Chandler Prep finished their High school career achieving perfect GPA scores.

Curriculum
Chandler Prep follows a strictly liberal arts curriculum. All students are required to follow a core curriculum with the addition of Latin in Grades 6-8 and their choice of one foreign language in Grades 9-12 (Latin then Ancient Greek, German, Spanish, or French). The Fine Arts curriculum rotates between Art, Poetry, Music, and Drama.

Notable alumni
 James Rallison – YouTube Creator

See also
Great Hearts Academies
Classical education movement
Liberal Arts

References

Charter schools in Arizona
Educational institutions established in 2005
Schools in Maricopa County, Arizona
Public high schools in Arizona
Public middle schools in Arizona
2005 establishments in Arizona